On May 28, 1918, Azerbaijan declared its independence. By the decision of the Council of Ministers of the Azerbaijan Democratic Republic dated June 26, 1918, the Azerbaijani Special Corps was established with 5,000 personnel led by General Ali-Agha Shikhlinski. On July 11, military mobilization was announced by a government decree. All Muslim citizens of the Republic of Azerbaijan born in 1894-1899 were called up for military service. Samad bey Mehmandarov was appointed Minister of War.

List 
These were the generals of the army:

References

Works cited 
 Nəzirli, Şəmistan. Cümhuriyyət generalları. Bakı: Hərbi nəşriyyat, 1995. 211 səh.
 Исмаилов Э. Э. Персидские принцы из дома Каджаров в Российской империи / Ответственный редактор А. А. Молчанов. — М.: Старая Басманная, 2009. — 593 с.

See also 
 List of Soviet repressions of Azerbaijani military officers (1920–1938)

Azerbaijani generals
Lists of Azerbaijani military personnel
Azerbaijan